This article presents top ten lists of male singles tennis players, as ranked by various official and non-official ranking authorities throughout the history of the sport. Rankings of U.S.-only professionals pre-Open Era, and U.S.-only amateurs during World War II are also included.

The article is split into two sections: 1912–1972, and since 1973 when the first official ATP rankings were published, for ease of navigation.

Top ten rankings by year

1912

1913

1914

1915–1918 
no world rankings (World War I)

1919

1920

1921

1922

1923

1924

1925

1926

1927

1928

1929

1930

1931

1932

1933

1934

1935

1936

1937

1938 

 Last Wallis Myers ranking before his death.

1939

1940

1941

1942

1943–44 
no world rankings (World War II)

1945

1946

1947

1948

1949

1950 
 Last ranking by Olliff before his death.

1951

1952 

 Last ranking by Gillou before his death.

1953

1954

1955

1956

1957

1958

1959

1960

1961

1962

1963

1964

1965 

 Last ranking by Potter for World Tennis magazine.

1966

1967

1968 (start of Open Era)

1969

1970

1971

1972

1973–present

See also 

 World number 1 ranked male tennis players
 List of ATP number 1 ranked singles tennis players
 Top ten ranked female tennis players
 Top ten ranked female tennis players (1921–1974)

Notes

References

Bibliography 

 
 
 
 
 

Men's tennis
10
10
RANKIN TELESKOOP MAGAZINE 1967.Pro's & Amateurs) 1.Rod Laver 2.Ken Rosewall 3.Andres Gimeno 4.Lew Goad 5.Mal Anderson 6.Earl Buchholtz 7.Dennis Ralston 8.Fred Stolle 9.Pancho Gonzales 10.Manuel Santana (Amateur) 11.Alex Olmedo 12.Nicola Pietrangeli (Amateur)13 Luis Ayala 14.Pancho Segura 15.Fred Sedgman 16.John Newcombe (amateur) 17.Tom Okker(Amateur) 18.Arthur Ashe (Amateur) 19.Stan Smith (Amateur)20.Barry Mackay21.Neal Fraser (Amateur) 22.Owen Davidson (Amateur & Prof) 23.Mike Davies 24.Robert Haillet 25.Sven Davidson (Amateur)retired: Ken Mc Gregor, Mervyn Rose, Dick Savitt (Amateur)Ashley Cooper, Tony Trabert